Granadaene is the trivial name of a non-isoprenoid polyene that constitutes the red pigment characteristic of Streptococcus agalactiae (group B streptococcus).

Characteristics 
Granadaene contains a conjugated system made up of a linear chain of 12 conjugated double bonds which is connected to the amino acid ornithine at one end and the sugar rhamnose at the other.
Granadaene is dark red, odorless, insoluble in water, methanol, ethanol, diethyl ether, acetone, hexane, dimethyl sulfoxide (DMSO), acetonitrile, tetrahydrofuran, chloroform, and in most solvents, it is soluble in DMSO–0.1% trifluoroacetic acid (TFA).
Granadaene, can be extracted from cultures of S.agalactiae in granada broth (granada medium without agar) with 0.1 M potassium hydroxide (KOH) and purified by size-exclusion chromatography on Sephadex LH using DMSO–0.1%TFA.

The ultraviolet-visible absorption spectrum of the granadaene (in DMSO/TFA) is almost identical to that of a carotene with a similar conjugated system of double bonds  (e.g. alpha-carotene), that is why the GBS pigment was considered to be a carotene for many years.

Granadaene and S.agalactiae detection and identification 
Production of the red pigment granadaene is a phenotypic trait specific to β-hemolytic GBS, and because of that, detection of red colonies from clinical samples, when cultivated on granada medium, allows the straightforward identification of GBS.

Biological relevance 
Granadaene is an organic compound produced by S.agalactiae. It is the product of a metabolic pathway similar to that of biosynthesis of fatty acids. The enzymes necessary for the biosynthesis of granadaene in GBS are coded by a gene cluster of 12 genes, the cyl operon, and a pathway for the pigment biosynthesis requiring all the genes of the cyl operon has been proposed. Like the biosynthesis of the pigment, the hemolytic activity requires also in GBS the 12 genes of the cyl operon.

The pigment is localized, in GBS, in the cell membrane, where it could play a role in membrane stabilization, similarly to the role of carotenes in other bacterial membranes.

In addition to S.agalactiae the presence of granadaene and the cyl genes has been reported in pigmented Acidipropionibacterium spp. (former Propionibacterium) as A.jensenii, A.thoenii and A.virtanenii , where it can cause defects such as red spots in some cheeses. Probably granadaene is also present in other related species such as Pseudopropionibacterium rubrum.

Granadaene is also produced by strains of Lactocococcus garvieae/petaury/formosensis group where the cyl cluster is also present.

The cyl genes has been cloned in Lactococcus lactis (a non-hemolytic non-pigmented Gram-positive bacterium) and the expression of the GBS cyl operon conferred hemolysis, pigmentation, and cytoxicity to Lactococcus lactis. Proving that the expression of the genes of the cyl operon is sufficient for Granadaene production in a heterologous host.

Granadaene and GBS Virulence
The hemolytic activity of granadene is strongly linked to the length of its polyene chain. 

It has been proposed that granadaene is indeed the hemolysin of S.agalactiae, and because the GBS hemolysin is a broad-spectrum cytolysin able to destroy many eukaryotic cells, it is considered an important virulence factor for GBS.

References 

Rhamnosides
Polyenes
Biological pigments